The 375mm ASW rocket family  is an ahead-throwing anti-submarine warfare (ASW) rocket launcher system developed by Bofors. The system has three types of launcher with either two, four or six barrels, and entered service in the 1950s. France built the four-barrelled system under licence then developed the six-barrel system and used it on many classes of warship including  and  destroyers and A 69-class avisos (corvettes). The Netherlands used it in the s. It was also was used by Royal Malaysian Navy on the s before they removed it from the ships. Indonesia use it on its three s and Brazil on six s, all of which are still in service. The rocket system is also being used by the Turkish Burak-class corvette's which are all ex-D'Estienne d'Orves-class A69 type aviso corvettes, mainly designed for coastal anti-submarine defense and ocean escort missions.

Other ballistic ASW systems
 Limbo
 Squid
 Hedgehog
 RBU-6000
 Weapon Alpha
 Terne

References

Rockets and missiles
Anti-submarine weapons
Naval weapons of Sweden